Munich Hackerbrücke station is a station opened in 1972 on the Munich S-Bahn network below Hackerbrücke (Hacker bridge) that is close to Munich Central Station.  It is classified by Deutsche Bahn as a category 3 station and has a 211 metre long central platform between two platform tracks and is located directly in front of a 3.2 percent drop into the S-Bahn trunk line tunnel. Immediately to the south is the Munich Hauptbahnhof signal box, which monitors and controls all the track work at the Central Station and on the adjoining lines (excluding the S-Bahn).

Particularly during the periods of the Oktoberfest, this station is important because it is only about 650 metres from the main venue at Theresienwiese. Munich Hackerbrücke is served by the S-Bahn lines 1 to 8. Only the S-Bahn lines S 20, S 27 and A do not operate here. The Munich central bus station opened north of the station on 11 September 2009.

Notable places nearby
Circus Krone
Hackerbrücke
Zentraler Omnibusbahnhof München

References

Hackerbrücke
Hackerbrücke
Maxvorstadt
Railway stations in Germany opened in 1972